Natasha Emma Little (born 2 October 1969) is an English actress. She is best known for her roles as Edith Thompson in the film Another Life, Lady Caroline Langbourne in the BBC miniseries The Night Manager, and Christina Moxam in the BBC miniseries Thirteen.

Early life
Little was born in Liverpool on 2 October 1969. Her mother is a teacher and her father an NHS manager. For the first decade of her life, she lived in the Middle East, where her father set up immunisation clinics for the WHO and her mother taught at an English speaking school. Her family then moved back to England and settled in Loughton, Essex. She attended Loughton County High School for Girls, and joined a Saturday drama group called the Epping Youth Theatre. She originally planned on a career in law, but was persuaded to apply to drama school by her teacher after her role in a school production of the musical Chicago. She attended the Guildhall School of Music and Drama and graduated in 1994 with a BA in drama.

Career
Little's first acting role after graduating was a part in the play The Tenth Man at the New End Theatre. She was talent-spotted whilst performing a play at the Latchmere pub theatre and subsequently won the role of Jenny in the successful ITV drama London's Burning in 1995. She had roles in the Lynda La Plante televised series Supply & Demand in 1997 and that same year she won the role of Rachel in the critically acclaimed BBC drama This Life (series 2).

Other television credits include The Bill (1998); Big Women (1998); Becky Sharp in Vanity Fair (1998); Cadfael (1998); The Nearly Complete and Utter History of Everything (1999); Man and Boy; Far from the Madding Crowd; Murder in Mind (2003); playing Vicki Westbrook in the spy drama, Spooks (2003); The Crooked Man (2003); Angell's Hell (2005) and playing Lady Hamilton in the Ricky Gervais comedy Extras (2005).

Film credits include The Clandestine Marriage (1999); The Criminal (1999); Kevin & Perry Go Large (2000); Greenfingers (2000); Another Life (2001); Byron (2003); Vanity Fair (2004), where she played Lady Jane Sheepshanks Crawley; The Queen of Sheba's Pearls (2004) and A Congregation of Ghosts 2009) among others.

Theatre roles include Voyage Round My Father; The Vagina Monologues; Les Mains; The Alchemist and the Richard Eyre play The Novice. Little took her role in The Novice at the last minute. She was originally contracted to star in the film Enigma (2001), but the role was subsequently given to the actress Kate Winslet, who had previously turned the part down due to her pregnancy, but changed her mind. Little was paid her full fee of £300,000 and appeared in The Novice at the Almeida Theatre instead.

Little won the award for Best Actress in a Drama Series at the 1999 Biarritz International Television Festival for her role as Becky Sharp in Vanity Fair and she also received a BAFTA nomination for Best Actress in a Drama Series for the same role. In 2001, Little won the award for Best Actress at the Cherbourg Film Festival for her role in Another Life.

She also played Ann Shapland in Agatha Christie's Poirot (Cat Among the Pigeons), Megan Hudson in Mistresses, Nemo's mother in Mr. Nobody, Flick in The Boys Are Back and Allanah Mountstuart in Any Human Heart.

In 2008, she appeared as a guest star in Foyle's War. In 2011 she portrayed the wife of hostage negotiator Dominic King (played by Trevor Eve) in the three-part drama Kidnap and Ransom, a role which she reprised in the 2012 second series, and played Elspeth Munro in the BBC drama Young James Herriot.

In 2013 she appeared in the premiere production of the play Longing. In 2015 she played Liz Cromwell in the BBC production of Wolf Hall.

In 2016, she appeared in "Shut Up and Dance", an episode of the anthology series Black Mirror.

In 2018,  she appeared in "Birches" UK based feature,. based on the novel 'Silver Birches' (published in 2009 by Adrian Plass), which was turned into a film directed by Randall Stevens, with screenplay by Mark Freiburger and it also starred Anna Acton and Todd Carty.

Little appeared in Seasons 2 and 3 (during 2018 and 2019) of the Amazon Original "Absentia (TV series)".

Personal life
Little lives in the Leytonstone area of London with her husband, Polish actor Bo Poraj, whom she married in May 2003. They have two sons.

Little is a trained singer with a mezzo-soprano voice and is trained in basic jazz, ballroom and period dance. Her other hobbies include dancing and playing the flute.

Filmography

Film

Television

Video games

Theatre

Awards and nominations

References

External links

Natasha Little CV, hamiltonhodell.co.uk. Retrieved 19 March 2016.

1969 births
English film actresses
English stage actresses
English television actresses
Living people
People from Loughton
Actresses from Liverpool
20th-century English actresses
21st-century English actresses
Alumni of the Guildhall School of Music and Drama